Andrea Malinconico (1624 in Naples – 1698) was an Italian painter of the Renaissance period, active near his natal city of Naples. He was a pupil of Massimo Stanzione.

Notes

References

17th-century Neapolitan people
17th-century Italian painters
Italian male painters
Painters from Naples
Italian Renaissance painters
1624 births
1698 deaths